Live at the El Mocambo is a 1993 live album by Elvis Costello and the Attractions. Recorded on March 6, 1978, from a live radio broadcast by CHUM-FM in Toronto. A tape of the broadcast was obtained by the Canadian division of CBS records and released as an exclusive Canadian promotional album in the same year. As the show's fame began to grow, it became heavily bootlegged.

It was first legally made available with the release (as Live at El Mocambo) either as disc 4 of the 2½ Years 4CD box set or to US purchasers of the first three CDs, in exchange for tokens included in the CD packaging, directly from Rykodisc. The concert was reissued, as a mainstream release, on 29 September 2009 by Hip-O Records, with the same content of the 1978 promotional album.

Track listing
All songs written by Elvis Costello. "Less Than Zero (Dallas version)" was not recorded in Dallas, the title indicates that this version of the song has lyrics which were rewritten to refer to Lee Harvey Oswald rather than British political figure Oswald Mosley.
 "Mystery Dance" – 2:19
 "Waiting for the End of the World" – 3:52
 "Welcome to the Working Week" – 1:19
 "Less Than Zero" (Dallas version) – 4:08
 "The Beat" – 3:33
 "Lip Service" – 2:26
 "(I Don't Want to Go to) Chelsea" – 3:56
 "Little Triggers" – 2:47
 "Radio Radio" – 2:33
 "Lipstick Vogue" – 4:46
 "Watching the Detectives" – 5:48
 "Miracle Man/Band Introduction" – 4:07
 "You Belong to Me" – 2:32
 "Pump It Up" – 4:42

Personnel
Elvis Costello – guitar, vocals
The Attractions
Steve Nieve – keyboards
Bruce Thomas – bass
Pete Thomas – drums
with:
Martin Belmont – guitar on "Pump It Up"

References

External links 
 Elvis Costello - Live at the El Mocambo (rec. 1978, rel. 1993) album releases & credits at Discogs
 Elvis Costello & The Attractions - Live at the El Mocambo (rec. 1978, rel. 1993) album to be listened on Spotify

Elvis Costello live albums
1993 live albums
Rykodisc live albums
Albums recorded at the El Mocambo
Promotional albums
Music of Toronto